Avaneeswaram is a village in Kerala, India.

It may also refer to:
 Avaneeswaram railway station, a railway station in Kerala.
 Avaneeswaram S R Vinu, a carnatic violinist in Kerala.